G19 may refer to:

 , an Auk-class minesweeper of the Mexican Navy
 County Route G19 (California)
 Glock 19, a pistol
 , a Wickes-class destroyer of the Royal Navy
 Logitech G19, a computer keyboard
  (hull number G19), a French ocean liner